U-47 may refer to one of the following German submarines:

 , a Type U 43 submarine launched in 1915 and that served in the First World War until scuttled on 28 October 1918
 During the First World War, Germany also had these submarines with similar names:
 , a Type UB II submarine launched in 1916; transferred to Austria-Hungary on 20 July 1917 and renamed U-47; surrendered in 1920
 , a Type UC II submarine launched in 1916 and sunk on 18 November 1917
 , a Type VIIB submarine that served in the Second World War until she went missing after 7 March 1941

U-47 or U-XLVII may also refer to:
 , a U-43 class submarine of the Austro-Hungarian Navy

Submarines of Germany

sl:U-47 (Kriegsmarine)